The Sea Garden (Bulgarian: Морска градина, Morska gradina) is the Bulgarian port city of Burgas' largest and best known public park. It is located along the city's coast on the Black Sea and it is an important tourist attraction and a national monument of landscape architecture on the Balkans.

Near the Sea Garden is located one of the most popular district of Burgas - district of Lazur. The area of the park is around 800 decares. The park is planted with trees and shrubs. In those areas there are many sculptures sparsed around. The most important monument probably is the monument of Alexander Pushkin.

History 
The first trees in the park were planted by the soldiers of the 24th Infantry Regiment (created in 1889).

In 1910 the architect Georgi Duhtev (* August 7, 1885; † November 9, 1955) was hired by the Municipality of Burgas to start the construction of the Sea Garden. The young architect became the governor of the Borisova Gradina in Sofia. He turned the swamp between the city and the sea into one of the most beautiful parks in Bulgaria. Thanks to his passion for exotic plants, today there are hundreds of plants in the Garden from all continents, and the old part of the Sea Garden, or quarter, is a monument to the art of landscape design and gardening. 

In 1936 the first bay is opened and two years later in 1938 the Marine Casino is built. 

In 1975 a new bay is built with steel-reinforced concrete structure.

Landmarks 
 Summer Theatre
 Summer Scene "Snail"
 the Pantheon
 the Marine Casino
 the Bay of Burgas
 the house of the creator
 Exhibition of flowers "Flora"
 Alley and monument "A. Pushkin"

Festivals 

 The Sand Sculpture Festival
 Spirit of Burgas
 Sea Garden Festival (since 2014)
 BlueZZ fest
 Burgas and the Sea (Бургас и морето, Burgas i moreto)

External links 

 The Sea Garden in Burgas, www.morskatagradina.com

Burgas
Tourist attractions in Burgas Province
Geography of Burgas Province
Gardens in Bulgaria